The British Wildlife Photography Awards is an annual photographic competition established in 2009. It features images of wild species and habitats taken in the United Kingdom, the Isle of Man, or the Channel Islands. The competition is followed by a national tour, displaying winning and commended photographs in regional galleries and venues.

Since 2010, a book of winning entries has been published annually by AA Publishing.  In 2019 the Coast and Marine category part of the competition was expanded to include entrants from: the Coast of Ireland, England, Northern Ireland, Wales and Scotland.

Overall winners

References

External links

Official website

Photography awards
Photography exhibitions
Awards established in 2009
Nature photography
2009 establishments in the United Kingdom
Annual events in the United Kingdom
Wildlife of the United Kingdom